Anastasia Sergeyevna Zadorozhnaya (born August 30, 1985) is a Russian film actress, singer, TV presenter and fashion model. She is dubbed as the Russian Britney Spears.

Biography
Anastasia Zadorozhnaya was born in Fedotovo, Vologda Oblast, Russian SFSR, Soviet Union (now Russia). In  family of a serviceman.

In 1996 she became a soloist of the children's musical group Neposedy.

In 2001 she won the first role  in  series  Simple Truths, where she got the role of schoolgirl Anzhelika Selivyorstova. In the summer of 2002, after graduation, she entered the acting department of GITIS. In the same year, on the set of the program  12 evil spectators  Zadorozhnaya met her future producer Pyotr Sheksheyev. Professional cooperation Zadorozhnaya and  Sheksheyev began only in 2003, when the first recordings of Nastya were made at the studio of Yuri Aizenshpis and the official website of the artist was launched. Then she starred in the video for the song  Why Trample on My Love  of the popular group Smyslovye Gallyutsinatsii.

In 2005 Zadorozhnaya was selected for the role of Vasilisa (Vasya), the main character of the youth series  The Club that brought her all-Russian popularity. Nastya's partners in the set were Pyotr Fyodorov and Pavel Priluchny.

In 2007, the track I Will be placed on the 41st place in the Hot Adult Contemporary Tracks. In 2010 she was recognized as the sexiest actress of  national cinema by the results of the  TOP10SEXY Award.

In 2011, she was invited to the role of Cecile, a young heroine of the tragic fandom by Leonid Filatov, written on the motives of the novel by Pierre Choderlos de Laclos Dangerous Liaisons.

Personal life
A few years met with figure skater Sergei Slavnov, then broke up with him.

Selected filmography

References

External links
 Official site
 
 Настя Задороржная on KinoPoisk

1985 births
Living people
People from Vologodsky District
21st-century Russian actresses
Russian film actresses
Russian television actresses
Russian stage actresses
21st-century Russian singers
Russian pop singers
Russian television presenters
Russian child singers
20th-century Russian women singers
20th-century Russian singers
21st-century Russian women singers
Russian women television presenters